Dary's burrowing snake (Adelphicos daryi) is a species of snake in the family Colubridae. The species is native to Guatemala.

Etymology
The specific name, daryi, is in honor of Guatemalan biologist Mario Dary Rivera (1928-1981).

Taxonomy
A. daryi is a member of the veraepacis species group.

Geographic range and habitat

Description
A. daryi is large for its species group.

Behavior
Dary's burrowing snake is terrestrial, fossorial, and mainly nocturnal.

Conservation status
A. daryi is threatened by urban sprawl.

References

Further reading
Köhler G (2008). Reptiles of Central America, 2nd Edition. Offenbach, Germany: Herpeton Verlag. 400 pp. . (Adelphicos daryi, p. 199).

Adelphicos
Endangered animals
Snakes of Central America
Reptiles of Guatemala
Endemic fauna of Guatemala
Reptiles described in 1982
Taxa named by Jonathan A. Campbell
Taxonomy articles created by Polbot